Baraga may refer to:

Places 

 Baraga, Michigan
 Baraga Township, Michigan
 Baraga County, Michigan

Surname 

 Bishop Frederic Baraga

See also

Baragar